The Master of the Household is the operational head (see Chief operating officer) of the "below stairs" elements of the Royal Households of the United Kingdom. The role has charge of the domestic staff, from the Royal Kitchens, the pages and footmen, to the housekeeper and their staff.

Since 2004 the Office of the Prince of Wales has included a Master of the Household.

List of Masters of the Household
Richard Browne 1603–1604
Sir Robert Vernon bef. 1608 – c.1625
Charles Glemham c. 1625 – 1625
Roger Palmer 1626–1632
 In abeyance 1632–1645
George Lisle c. 1645 – 1648
 In abeyance? 1648–1660
Sir Herbert Price, 1st Baronet 1660–1665 and 1666–1678
Honourable Henry Bulkeley 1678–1688
Sir Thomas Felton, 4th Baronet 1689–1708
Edmund Dunch 1708–1712
Sir William Pole, 4th Baronet 1712–1714
Edmund Dunch 1714–1719
Sir Conyers Darcy,  1720–1730
Sir George Treby 1730–1741
Sir John Harris 1741–1767
The Right Honourable Henry Thynne 1768–1771
Sir Francis Henry Drake, 5th Baronet 1771–1794
Sir Henry Strachey, 1st Baronet 1794–1810
Sir William Kenrick 1810–1812
Samuel Hulse 1812–1827
Sir Frederick Beilby Watson 1827–1838
The Right Honourable Sir Charles Murray,  1838–1844
Captain Henry Meynell 1844–1845
Major-General Sir George Bowles 1845–1851
The Right Honourable General Sir Thomas Biddulph 1851–1866
The Right Honourable Major-General Sir John Cowell,  1866–1894
Lieutenant-Colonel Lord Edward Pelham-Clinton,  1894–1901
The Right Honourable Horace Farquhar, Lord Farquhar,  1901–1907 (later Earl Farquhar)
Lieutenant Colonel Sir Charles Arthur Andrew Frederick,  1907–1912
Lieutenant-Colonel The Honourable Sir Derek Keppel,  1913–1936
Brigadier Sir Smith Child, 2nd Baronet,  1936–1941
Lieutenant-Colonel The Honourable Sir Piers Legh,  1941–1953
Major Sir Mark Milbank, 4th Baronet,  1954–1967
Brigadier Sir Geoffrey Hardy-Roberts,  1967–1973
Vice-Admiral Sir Peter Ashmore,  1973–1986
Rear-Admiral Sir Paul Greening,  1986–1992
Major-General Sir Simon Cooper,  1992–2000
Vice-Admiral Sir Anthony Blackburn,  2000–2004
Air Marshal Sir David Walker,  2005–2013
Vice-Admiral Sir Tony Johnstone-Burt,  2013–

List of Deputy Masters of the Household
Lieutenant-Colonel Sir Charles Arthur Andrew Frederick,  1901–1907
Harry Lloyd-Verney,  1907–1911
Lieutenant-Colonel Honourable Sir Derek Keppel,  1911–1912
Captain Lord Arthur John Hamilton 1913–1914
Honourable Sir Harry Stonor,  1918–1921
Captain Lord Claud Nigel Hamilton,  1922–1924
Brigadier-General Sir Smith Child, 2nd Baronet  1929–1936
Lieutenant-Colonel Ririd Myddleton,  1937–1939
Group Captain Peter Townsend,  1950–52
Major Mark Milbank,  1952–1954
Lieutenant-Colonel Lord Plunket,  1954–1975
Lieutenant-Colonel Sir Blair Stewart-Wilson,  1976–1994
Lieutenant-Colonel Sir Guy Acland,  1994–1999
Lieutenant-Colonel Charles Richards,  1999–

The Staff

 Master of the Household
            |
       ------------------
       |                |
  Deputy Master      Master's Secretary
       |
       |--------------------------------------------------------------
       |                       |                                     |
       |        Lady Clerk to the Deputy Master                 Chief Clerk
       |                                                             |
       |-------------------------                          
       |                        |
       |             Assistant to the Master(Food)
       |                        |
       |                ----------------------------------------------
       |                |                                            |
       |   Deputy Assistant Master (Food)           Lady Clerk to the Assistant Master (Food)
       |                |
       |   Catering Office Administrator
       |                |
       |           Senior Clerk
       |                |
       |              Clerk
       |                |
       |          --------------------------------------------------------------------------
       |          |                      |                   |             |               |
       |     Royal Chef        Head Coffee Room Maid    Dining Room     Canteen         Senior
       |          |                      |               Supervisor    Supervisor      Storeman
       |   Senior Sous Chef          Deputy Head             |             |               |
       |          |               Coffee Room Maid         Senior       Canteen        Storemen
       |   Pastry Sous Chef              |              Dining Room    Assistants
       |          |               Coffee Room Maids      Assistants        |
       |      Sous Chef                                      |        Daily Ladies
       |          |                                     Dining Room
       |    Senior Cooks                                 Assistants
       |          |                                          |
       |        Cooks                                     Wash-up
       |          |                                      Assistants
       |     Apprentices
       |          |
       |   Kitchen Porters
       |
       |-------------------------
       |                        |
       |          Assistant to the Master (General)
       |                        |
       |        ---------------------------------------
       |        |                                     |
       |        |                     Lady Clerk to the Assistant Master (General)
       |        |                                     |
       |        |-------------------------            |---- Royal Florist
       |        |                        |            |
       |        |                  Palace Foreman     |---- Senior Clerk
       |        |                        |                     |
       |        |       -----------------|                 ---------------------
       |        |       |           |----|-----|           |        |          |       
       |        |       |         Palace    Fendersmith  Clerk   Basement    Night
       |        |       |       Attendants                       Cleaners  Patrolmen
       |        |       |
       |        |       |-----------------------------------------------------------------
       |        |       |              |            |           |           |            |
       |        |     French        Carpet      Locksmith    Gilders     Cabinet   Upholsterers
       |        |    Polisher      Planners                              Makers
       |        |
       |   Palace Steward
       |        |
       |        ---------------------------------------
       |        |                                     |
       |   Page of the                  Yeoman of the Royal Pantries
       |     Chambers                                  |
       |        |             ---------------------------------------------------
       |        |             |                       |                         |
       |        |      Assistant Yeoman       Assistant Yeoman         Assistant Yeoman                            
       |        |      of the Plate Pantry    of Windsor Castle    of the Glass & China Pantry
       |        |             |                                                 |
       |        |        Underbutlers                                     Underbutlers
       |        |
       |        |------------------------------------------------------------------
       |        |              |                |                                 |
       |    Deputy Page   Pages of the   Yeoman of the                  Travelling Yeoman
       |  of the Chamber   Backstairs     Royal Cellars                           |
       |        |                               |            -------------------------------
       |        |------------               Assistant        |                             |
       |        |           |               Yeoman        Sergeant                  Luggage Porters
       |   Pages of the  Queen's                |          Footman
       |     Presence     Piper           Underbutlers       |
       |                                                   Deputy
       |------------------------------------              Sergeant
       |        |                          |               Footman
       |   Superintendent           Superintendent           |
       |  of Windsor Castle        of Holyroodhouse          |--------------
       |        |                          |                 |             |
       |    Assistant           Office & Security Staff    Footmen    Livery Porters
       |  Superintendent
       |        |
       |   Office Staff
       |
 Chief Housekeeper
       |
       |-----------------------------------------------------------------------------
       |                  |                 |                 |                     |
     Deputy          Housekeeper of    Housekeeper of    Housekeeper of      Housekeeper of
  Housekeeper of     Windsor Castle    Holyroodhouse   Sandringham House     Balmoral Castle
 Buckingham Palace        |                 |                 |                     |
       |              Housemaids        Housemaids       Housemaids            Housemaids
   Housemaids

References

Sources

Hoey, Brian (1992). All The Queen's Men: Inside The Royal Household. London: HarperCollins. .
Master of the Household 1660–1837

External links
 Office of Master of the Household under the Tudors

Positions within the British Royal Household
Ceremonial officers in the United Kingdom